Taylor Anthony Booth (born May 31, 2001) is an American professional soccer player who plays as a midfielder for Eredivisie club Utrecht.

Club career

Youth career
Booth joined the Bayern Munich youth team from the Real Salt Lake youth academy in January 2019. He made his professional debut for Bayern Munich II in the 3. Liga on June 14, 2020, coming on as a substitute in the 73rd minute for Malik Tillman in the away match against Waldhof Mannheim, which finished as a 3–2 win. He finished the 2019–20 season with two appearances. He also made two appearances for the reserve team during the 2020–21 season before being loaned out to SKN St. Pölten.

St. Pölten
On February 8, 2021, Booth was loaned to Austrian side SKN St. Pölten until the end of the season.

Bayern Munich
On August 25, he was promoted to Bayern Munich's senior squad for their 2021–22 DFB-Pokal first round fixture against Bremer SV. He came as a substitute in the second half and played 22 minutes in the 12–0 victory.

Utrecht
On January 28, 2022, Booth signed a pre-contract with Eredivisie club Utrecht to join the team as a free agent in the summer.

After scoring a goal in both of Utrecht’s league matches during November 2022, booth was named the November Eredivisie Player of the Month.

International career
Booth has represented the United States at a number of youth levels, from under-15 to under-19. Most notably, he was included in the United States squad for the 2017 FIFA U-17 World Cup in India. He made two appearances in the tournament, helping his team to the quarter-finals before losing 4–1 to eventual champions England. On December 3, 2021, he was called up for the first time to the United States senior team for the friendly match against Bosnia and Herzegovina on December 18  but has yet to make a senior team appearance.

Personal life
Booth was born in Eden, Utah, to Kelli (née Carver) and Chad Booth, both collegiate soccer players. Through his father's Italian heritage, he was able to obtain an Italian passport, allowing him to move to Germany at 17. Booth was born with torticollis, which required physical therapy as an infant. He is a member of the Church of Jesus Christ of Latter-day Saints.

Career statistics

Club

Honors
Individual
Eredivisie Player of the Month: November 2022

References

External links
 
 
 
 
 

2001 births
Living people
People from Weber County, Utah
Soccer players from Utah
American soccer players
United States men's youth international soccer players
American people of Italian descent
American expatriate soccer players
American expatriate soccer players in Germany
American expatriate sportspeople in the Netherlands
Expatriate footballers in the Netherlands
Association football midfielders
FC Bayern Munich II players
FC Utrecht players
3. Liga players
FC Bayern Munich footballers
SKN St. Pölten players